MAA is a Japanese recording artist, former TV host and model. Previously known as Mar (stylized as MAR), she was vocalist of the alternative rock band Marbell from 2006 to 2010. When they disbanded she embarked on a solo career, switching to pop music.

History
MAA was born on January 25, 1986, in Yokosuka, Kanagawa to a Japanese mother and an American father. She started as a model and later became a host for a TV show called Visual Shock. Through this job she met fashion designer H. Naoto (who would later design the clothes and outfits for Marbell).

2006–2010: Marbell
In 2006, she, going by the name Mar, and Tsunoda Takanori formed the alternative rock band Marbell. They were later joined by bassist Azusa and drummer yu-ya before releasing their debut album Sister on May 14, 2008. The band toured throughout Japan, mainly performing live in Tokyo, but also performed at the 2008 Otakon convention in the United States. Four of the songs from their album were performed by the band on May 3, 2008, at the first day of the hide memorial summit, which gave Marbell the opportunity to play for a huge audience at Ajinomoto Stadium. However, the band was inactive throughout 2009 and on March 10, 2010, it was officially announced that Marbell had disbanded after only four years together.

2010–present: Solo
Only six months later Mar debuted as a solo artist, under the name MAA, with the single "Ghost Enemy". The EP Monkey Kingdom was released on December 1, 2010, and reached number 158 on the Oricon chart. On July 21, 2011, her third single "OKay" was released and became the ending song for NTV's Happy Music. She released her first full-length album BubbleMan Engine on October 12.

Discography
Albums and EPs
 Monkey Kingdom (2010.12.01) – Oricon Albums Chart Peak Position: #158
 BubbleMan Engine (2011.10.12)

Singles
 "Ghost Enemy" (2010.09.22)
 
 "OKay" (2011.07.20) – used as the ending theme song for NTV's Happy Music
  – both used as theme songs for the pachinko games based on Tetsuo Hara's manga Cyber Blue

Other contributions
 "Fake Emotion feat. MAA" – on The Lowbrows' album Emotion (2010.11.24)
 "Ballerina Brain System -Michitomo Remix-" – on the compilation -D&N 10th Anniversary- Soul Works presents Gossip (2010.12.15)
 "Come Again" – on m-flo Tribute: Stitch the Future and Past (2011.04.20)
 "Tomorrow @ Your Kingdom" – on Celebrity presents Diary (2011.04.30)

With Marbell
 Sister (2008.05.14)

References

External links
 Official website

Japanese women singer-songwriters
Japanese singer-songwriters
Japanese alternative rock musicians
Japanese women pop singers
Japanese dance music singers
Japanese female models
Japanese television personalities
Japanese people of American descent
Japanese synth-pop singers
People from Yokosuka, Kanagawa
Living people
1986 births
Musicians from Kanagawa Prefecture
21st-century Japanese singers
21st-century Japanese women singers